Co-Dependents Anonymous (CoDA) is a twelve-step program for people who share a common desire to develop functional and healthy relationships. Co-Dependents Anonymous was founded by Ken and Mary Richardson and the first CoDA meeting attended by 30 people was held October 22, 1986  in Phoenix, Arizona. Within four weeks there were 100 people and before the year was up there were 120 groups. CoDA held its first National Service Conference the next year with 29 representatives from seven states. CoDA has stabilized at about a thousand meetings in the US, and with meetings active in 60 other countries and dozens online that can be reached at www.coda.org.

See also 

 Alcoholism in family systems
 Adult Children of Alcoholics
 Al-Anon/Alateen
 Codependency
 Emotions Anonymous
 List of twelve-step groups
 Nar-Anon
 Self-help groups for mental health
 Twelve Traditions

References

External links 
 Co-Dependents Anonymous
 Co-Dependents Anonymous - Australasia
 Co-Dependents Anonymous United Kingdom (and Meeting Information)
 Co-Dependents Anonymous - Ireland
 Co-Dependents Anonymous Literature 
 Co-Dependents Anonymous Online Forum
 Co-Dependents Anonymous Netherlands
 Co-Dependents Recovery Society (Canada)
 Co-Dependents Anonymous Arizona 
 Co-Dependents Anonymous Portland, Oregon and Metro Area 
 Co-Dependents Anonymous Tucson 
 Co-Dependientes anónimos (Colombia)
 Co-Dependents Anonymous (Germany)
 Co-Dependents Anonymous New Zealand
 

Codependency
Twelve-step programs
Mental health support groups
Organizations established in 1986
Non-profit organizations based in the United States
International non-profit organizations